Tectarius striatus is a species of sea snail, a marine gastropod mollusk in the family Littorinidae, the winkles or periwinkles. It is endemic to Macaronesia (Azores, Madeira, Savage Islands, Canary Islands and Cape Verde).

Description

Distribution

References

Littorinidae
Gastropods described in 1832
Molluscs of Macaronesia